Kubed is a village in the City Municipality of Koper in the Littoral region of Slovenia.

Churches

The former parish church in the settlement is dedicated to Saint Florian and there is a small chapel dedicated to Archangel Michael next to the cemetery outside the village.

References

External links

Kubed on Geopedia

Populated places in the City Municipality of Koper